This is a list of aircraft by date and usage. The date shown is the introduction of the first model of a line but not the current  model. For instance, while "the most popular" aircraft, such as Boeing 737 and 747 were introduced in 1960x, their recent models were revealed in the 21st century.

Civil aircraft

Civil air transport

Civil – general aviation

Military aircraft

Fighters

Bombers

Reconnaissance, electronic warfare and Airborne Early Warning

Carrier-based aircraft

Air support/attack aircraft

Training aircraft

Transport

Helicopters and Autogyros

Racing aircraft

Experimental aircraft

Seaplanes and Amphibians

Date and usage category
Aircraft